René André was a French swimmer. He competed in the men's 100 metre freestyle event at the 1908 Summer Olympics.

References

External links
 

Year of birth missing
Year of death missing
Olympic swimmers of France
Swimmers at the 1908 Summer Olympics
Place of birth missing
French male freestyle swimmers